Éguilles is a commune in the Bouches-du-Rhône department in southern France. It is halfway between Saint-Cannat and Aix-en-Provence.

History
Tracks of an early settlement dating back to the 3rd century BC have been found. However, it appears that in 124BC those tracks were destroyed.

In the 16th century, there were attacks from Aix-en-Provence and Les Baux-de-Provence, and the Castle was destroyed. In 1790 there were 180 inhabitants, mostly shepherds.

In the 19th century many inhabitants left owing to the Industrial Revolution. By 1936 there were only 730 inhabitants.

Population

Personalities
Jean Joseph Marius Diouloufet, Provençal writer, was born in Eguilles on 19 September 1771.

See also
Communes of the Bouches-du-Rhône department

References

External links

 Official website

Communes of Bouches-du-Rhône
Bouches-du-Rhône communes articles needing translation from French Wikipedia